The 2nd NKP Salve Challenger Trophy or Liberty Cup was an Indian domestic cricket tournament that was held in Hyderabad from 28 December to 31 December 1995. The series involved the domestic and national players from India allocated in India Seniors, India A, and India B. India Seniors won the Challenger trophy after defeating India A by 33 runs in the final.

Squads

Points Table

Matches

Group stage

Final

References 

Indian domestic cricket competitions